Coryphophylax brevicauda, the short-tailed bay island forest lizard, is an agamid lizard found in the Andaman and Nicobar Islands.

References

Coryphophylax
Fauna of the Andaman and Nicobar Islands
Reptiles of India
Reptiles described in 2012
Taxa named by Surendran Harikrishnan
Taxa named by Karthikeyan Vasudevan
Taxa named by Indraneil Das